Mew Lake is a lake in Nipissing District in Northeastern Ontario, Canada. The lake is in Algonquin Provincial Park, is part of the Saint Lawrence River drainage basin, and lies astride Ontario Highway 60.

The primary inflow, arriving at the southwest, and outflow, leaving at the northwest, is Jack Creek. A secondary, unnamed inflow arrives from Pewee Lake at the southwest. Jack Creek flows via the North Madawaska River, the Madawaska River and the Ottawa River to the Saint Lawrence River.

The Mew Lake Campground at Algonquin Provincial Park is on the lake. It is open year-round, with campsites with electrical hookup, radio-free and dog-free zones, and seven roofed accommodation yurts.

See also
List of lakes in Ontario

References

Lakes of Nipissing District